Dastgerdan may refer to:
 Dastgerdan, Razavi Khorasan
 Baghat-e Dastgerdan, Razavi Khorasan Province
 Dastgerdan, South Khorasan
 Dastgerdan District, in South Khorasan Province
 Dastgerdan Rural District, in South Khorasan Province

See also
 Dastgerd (disambiguation)